Deaconry may refer to :

 a Deacon's status and/or his clerical ministry 
 a Cardinal-deaconry, the titular church of a Cardinal-deacon